The following bridges are known as the Vietnam Veterans Memorial Bridge:

Vietnam Veterans Memorial Bridge (Baltimore) along Baltimore's Hanover Street (Maryland Route 2)
Vietnam Veterans Memorial Bridge (Richmond) along Virginia Route 895
Interstate 470 Bridge over the Ohio River in Wheeling, WV

See also
Vietnam Memorial Bridge, along the Connecticut River in Holyoke, Massachusetts